Jones Beach, also known as Boyds Beach, is a beach on the south-eastern coast of Australia, facing the Tasman Sea.

Description
The beach is also known as Boyds Beach, and the community behind it is Kiama Downs. A road runs the length of the beach. The northern half is given over to sand dunes, parks and the Kiama Downs Surf Life Saving Club, founded in 1982. Houses back the beach's southern half. The beach receives waves averaging , which result in a single bar usually cut by six, including permanent rips against each headland, the northern being the stronger. Rocks also occur in the surf toward the southern end.

It is a popular tourist spot and the beach is patrolled.  Facilities include wheelchair accessible toilets, limited undercover and shaded picnic areas, and bicycle racks. Pets, glass or bottles, firearms, and jet skis are not permitted.

Surfing competitions are held at Jones Beach between February and October, and a one-on-one competition held in November annually.

References

Wollongong
Beaches of New South Wales
Surfing locations in New South Wales